The 25th IBU Open European Championships were held in Ridnaun-Val Ridanna, Italy from January 23 to January 28, 2018. It was also a stage of the 2017–18 Biathlon IBU Cup.

There were a total of eight competitions held: Single Mixed Relay, Relay Mixed, Sprint Women, Sprint Men, Pursuit Women, Pursuit Men, Individual Women and Individual Men.

Schedule of events 
The schedule of the event stands below. All times in CET.

Results

Men's

Women's

Mixed

Medal table

References 

2018
2018 in biathlon
2018 in Italian sport
International sports competitions hosted by Italy
Sport in South Tyrol
January 2018 sports events in Italy